Joachim Adukor (born 2 May 1993) is a professional footballer who plays as a central midfielder for Kazakhstan Premier League club FC Aktobe. Born in Ghana, he plays for the Liberia national team.

Club career
Adukor plays as a central midfielder. He previously played for Gefle in the Swedish Allsvenskan, for Trofense in the Portuguese Segunda Liga, Béziers in France and OFI Crete in the Football League Greece.

On 15 August 2017, Adukor signed with Bosnian Premier League club Sarajevo. In the 2018–19 season, Adukor won the double with Sarajevo, winning both the Bosnian Premier League and the Bosnian Cup. He left Sarajevo in June 2019 after his contract with the club expired.

Shortly after leaving Sarajevo, on 1 July 2019, Adukor signed a contract with Hungarian Nemzeti Bajnokság I club Diósgyőri. Only one year later, on 8 September 2020, he came back to Sarajevo, signing a two-year contract. Adukor played his first game for Sarajevo since his return in a cup match against Radnički Lukavac on 13 October 2020.

International career
In October 2011, Adukor expressed his wish to link up with the Ghana under-20 national team ahead of the 2013 African U20 Championship. In June 2012, he was selected to join the squad for the forthcoming qualification campaign.

In May 2015, Adukor was invited to join the Ghana under-23 side for qualifiers for the All-Africa Games and the Olympic Games.

In June 2022 Adukor switched allegiances to represent Liberia internationally. He debuted for Liberia in 2023 Africa Cup of Nations qualifiers on 13 June 2022 playing whole 90 minutes in a loss to Morocco.

Career statistics

Club

Honors
Sarajevo
Bosnian Premier League: 2018–19
Bosnian Cup: 2018–19, 2020–21

References

External links
Joachim Adukor at Sofascore

1993 births
Living people
People with acquired Liberian citizenship
Liberian footballers
Association football midfielders
Nemzeti Bajnokság I players
Gefle IF players
C.D. Trofense players
AS Béziers (2007) players
OFI Crete F.C. players
FK Sarajevo players
Diósgyőri VTK players
FC Aktobe players
Allsvenskan players
Liga Portugal 2 players
Championnat National players
Football League (Greece) players
Premier League of Bosnia and Herzegovina players
Liberia international footballers
Liberian expatriate footballers
Liberian expatriate sportspeople in Sweden
Expatriate footballers in Sweden
Liberian expatriate sportspeople in Portugal
Expatriate footballers in Portugal
Liberian expatriate sportspeople in France
Expatriate footballers in France
Liberian expatriate sportspeople in Greece
Expatriate footballers in Greece
Liberian expatriates in Bosnia and Herzegovina
Expatriate footballers in Bosnia and Herzegovina
Liberian expatriate sportspeople in Hungary
Expatriate footballers in Hungary
Liberian expatriate sportspeople in Kazakhstan
Expatriate footballers in Kazakhstan
People from Tema
Ghanaian footballers
Ghanaian expatriate footballers
Ghana youth international footballers
Ghanaian expatriate sportspeople in Sweden
Ghanaian expatriate sportspeople in Portugal
Ghanaian expatriate sportspeople in France
Ghanaian expatriate sportspeople in Greece
Ghanaian expatriate sportspeople in Bosnia and Herzegovina
Ghanaian expatriate sportspeople in Hungary
Ghanaian expatriate sportspeople in Kazakhstan
Ghanaian people of Liberian descent